Erigeron glaucus is a species of flowering plant in the family Asteraceae known by the common name seaside fleabane, beach aster, or seaside daisy. It is native to the  West Coast of the United States.

Description 
The centers contain golden yellow disc florets and the edges are fringed with about 100 ray florets which may be long or quite short, and are shades of deep blue and purple to nearly white. The fruit is seed-like with many bristles at the tip.

Unusual for its genus (but not for plants near the coast), the plant is somewhat succulent.

Distribution and habitat 
The wildflower is native to the coastline of Oregon and California where it grows on beaches, coastal bluffs and dunes. While typical habitats include coastal bluffs, one highly specialised plant association is found within the two Cupressus macrocarpa dominant forests in Monterey County, California.

Ecology
E. glaucus occurs in several different plant associations. One of the specialized habitats is within the Monterey cypress forests of the Central California coast.

Gallery

References

External links

 
United States Department of Agriculture Plants Profile
Calphotos Photo gallery, University of California

glaucus
Flora of California
Flora of Oregon
Plants described in 1815
Flora without expected TNC conservation status